Mavie is an unincorporated community in the township of Clover Leaf, Pennington County, Minnesota, United States.

Notes

Unincorporated communities in Pennington County, Minnesota
Unincorporated communities in Minnesota